Events in the year 1958 in the People's Republic of China.

Incumbents 
 Chairman of the Chinese Communist Party: Mao Zedong
 President of the People's Republic of China: Mao Zedong
 Premier of the People's Republic of China: Zhou Enlai
 Chairman of the National People's Congress: Liu Shaoqi
 Vice President of the People's Republic of China: Zhu De
 Vice Premier of the People's Republic of China: Chen Yun

Governors  
 Governor of Anhui Province: Huang Yan
 Governor of Fujian Province: Ye Fei  
 Governor of Gansu Province: Deng Baoshan
 Governor of Guangdong Province: Chen Yu 
 Governor of Guizhou Province: Zhou Lin (politician)
 Governor of Hebei Province: Lin Tie then Liu Zihou 
 Governor of Heilongjiang Province: Ouyang Qin then Li Fanwu
 Governor of Henan Province: Wu Zhipu 
 Governor of Hubei Province: Zhang Tixue 
 Governor of Hunan Province: Cheng Qian 
 Governor of Jiangsu Province: Hui Yuyu 
 Governor of Jiangxi Province: Shao Shiping 
 Governor of Jilin Province: Li Youwen 
 Governor of Liaoning Province: Du Zheheng then Yuan Renyuan 
 Governor of Qinghai Province:
 until month unknown: Sun Zuobin
 month unknown: Sun Junyi
 starting month unknown: Yuan Renyuan
 Governor of Shaanxi Province: Zhao Shoushan
 Governor of Shandong Province: Zhao Jianmin then Tan Qilong 
 Governor of Shanxi Province: Wang Shiying then Wei Heng 
 Governor of Sichuan Province: Li Dazhang
 Governor of Yunnan Province: Guo Yingqiu (until November), Ding Yichuan (starting November)
 Governor of Zhejiang Province: Huo Shilian (until January), Zhou Jianren (starting January)

Events
 February 11 – Marshal Chen Yi succeeds Premier Zhou Enlai as Chinese Minister of Foreign affairs.
 May 23  – Chairman Mao Zedong started his "Great Leap Forward" movement in the People's Republic of China.
 July 31 – Chinese–Tibet Uprising.
 August 23 – Chinese Civil War: The Second Taiwan Strait crisis begins with the People's Liberation Army's bombardment of Quemoy.
 October Unknown date – Sichan Radio Manufacturing, as predecessor of home appliance and visual electronic brand Changhong was founded.

Births

Full date unknown
 Di Li Feng, Chinese contemporary artist

Deaths
 March 9 – Cheng Yanqiu, Chinese opera singer (born 1904)

See also 
 1958 in Chinese film

References 

 
Years of the 20th century in China
China